Udney Richardson (1869 - 1943) was a Canadian politician, who represented the electoral district of Wellington East from 1911 to 1919 in the Legislative Assembly of Ontario. He was a member of the Ontario Liberal Party.

Prior to his election to the legislature, Richardson served as reeve of Elora, Ontario. He was later reelected to that office, and was an owner of the local mill.

References

External links 
 

1866 births
1943 deaths
Ontario Liberal Party MPPs
People from Centre Wellington
Mayors of places in Ontario